Landmark Columbus is the progressive preservation program arm of Landmark Columbus Foundation that is dedicated to caring for and celebrating the world-renowned cultural heritage of Columbus, Indiana.

Projects and events

Landmark Columbus produces a number of ongoing projects in an effort to care for the city's cultural heritage. The organization is active in the community in various ways, including nominating the Irwin Conference Center for a Docomomo US National Citation of Merit in 2014 for the National Historic Landmark building designed by Eero Saarinen, which was restored through an adaptive reuse project by Cummins. Columbus historians David Sechrest and Ricky Berkey have been involved with the organization from the beginning, helping to create projects around both the early and modern history of the community.

Getty Foundation Keeping it Modern Architectural Conservation Grant 
Landmark Columbus received a 2019 Keeping it Modern Architectural Conservation Grant from the Getty Foundation for the iconic North Christian Church. With this grant, Landmark Columbus—together with Prudon & Partners, Reed-Hilderbrand, Bryony Roberts Studio, Enrique Ramirez, ICR-ICC and others—are developing a conservation management plan to provide the historical context and strategic guidance necessary for the church's long-term upkeep.

Friends of First Christian Church Architecture
Friends of First Christian Church Architecture (FFCCA) is a collaborative effort with a mission "to preserve the architecture and design elements of FCC, a National Historic Landmark designed by Eliel & Eero Saarinen in 1942." The project was launched in January 2017 as a partnership with First Christian Church, Heritage Fund, Landmark Columbus, and Indiana Landmarks. The first project for FFCCA was to help save the sanctuary skylight, which leaked for years and caused damage. In August 2018 FFCCA had raised enough resources from the congregation and throughout the community to have the skylight fully restored. Fundraising for the restoration of the skylight was a collaborative effort, and included contributions from the church congregation, Kenny Glass, Inc., and the Columbus Area Visitors Center.

Columbus Conversations
Columbus Conversation is an annual symposium held to address a pressing need in the community related to Columbus' cultural heritage. The series began in 2014 and featured Theodore Prudon's keynote presentation "Modern Architecture as Heritage", and included lectures by Marsh Davis, from Indiana Landmarks; Louis Joyner, a Columbus-based architect; Richard McCoy; and a conversation moderated by Harry McCawley.

The 2015 Columbus Conversation featured a panel discussion by Jeff Baker, the last president of Preserve to Enjoy, Inc.; Tricia Gilson from the Columbus Indiana Architectural Archives; Flora Chou, board member of Docomomo US; and Theodore Prudon, board president of Docomomo US. This moderated discussion defined ways that Landmark Columbus could raise awareness about caring for the area's cultural heritage and begin growing a constituency that actively helps in the cause.

Chaotic Tuesdays

In celebration of Jean Tinguely's masterwork, Chaos I, located inside the Commons, Landmark Columbus started "Chaotic Tuesdays" as a free community event during which everyone could see the kinetic artwork operate during the evening.  The idea for the event came from the director of Museum Tinguely, Roland Wetzel, when he visited in 2014. The event happens on the fourth Tuesday of every month and has grown to be a partnership between many in the community and led by the Columbus Area Arts Council. Professors from Ivy Tech bring drawing materials for the community and provide lessons on how to draw the artwork, which Tinguely himself did many times; his drawings of Chaos I are in collections around the world.

Landscape architecture cleanups

Landmark Columbus has organized a number of community efforts to help clean and maintain the landscape at North Christian Church, which was designed by Dan Kiley and is one of seven National Historic Landmarks in the city. Cleanups have addressed issues caused by storms and ongoing maintenance, including the dormant pruning of the many magnolias that surround the church.

Yearly bicycle rides
Landmark Columbus started a yearly bicycle tour in May that coincides with National Preservation Month and National Bike Month.  
 The 2015 "Olde Tyme Architectural Bicycle Ride" featured a tour of late 19th and early 20th century architecture and landscapes near downtown.
 The 2016 "Mad Men Bike Ride" featured many works of modern architecture, including stops at North Christian Church and the Miller House and Garden.
 The 2017 "Public Art Bike ride" featured a look at many of the public artworks around downtown.

Landmark Lego Challenge
In May 2016 Landmark Columbus held a first-of-its-kind competition that invited participants to build one of the seven National Historic Landmarks out of Lego bricks.   This project was launched in partnership with the Indianapolis Museum of Art, kids commons, the Columbus Indiana Architectural Archives, and other organizations.

Docomomo US Tour Day
Various partners began participating in "Tour Day" starting in 2013 to draw regional interest in visiting Columbus and seeing the modern architecture.
 In 2013, a tour was given of the Columbus Arts District and the Miller House and Gardens.
 In 2014, Indiana Landmarks created the "Landmarks Experience: Columbus," a day-long immersion with lectures and tours that included the Miller House.
 In 2015, Landmark Columbus created the "Saarinen, Pei, and the Plaza that Connected Them" tour, which looked at the relationship between the Cleo Rogers Memorial Library Henry Moore's Large Arch, and First Christian Church.

Documentation and surveys
In 2013 and 14, all of the public art in Bartholomew County was surveyed, photographed, and placed in the database of the Public Art Archive.  The list of public art in Bartholomew County, Indiana includes more than 100 artworks in a diverse group of places.  Also at this time, all of the resources in the Columbus Arts District and all of the modern buildings were surveyed, photographed, and published in the database of CultureNOW.  Other research projects have included investigations for public artworks that are now missing.

Ongoing series of talks
Landmark Columbus occasionally hosts experts of architecture, art, and community.  
2016
Michelangelo Sabatino 
ArtPrize and Exhibit Columbus
2018
Sam Lubell and Greg Goldin talking about never built projects in Columbus

Public art walking tours
With the rich history of public art throughout the community, walking tours are frequent. There is also a special walking tour every October in partnership with Reach Healthy Communities.

References

External links

 
 

Landmarks in Indiana
Architectural history